Otiorhynchus cribricollis is one of the many species in the weevil family (Curculionidae). It is native to the Mediterranean and a pest of apple orchards and vineyards in Western Australia.

Life history
Adults reproduce parthenogenically and all are females. Adults are also flightless.

References

Entiminae
Apple tree diseases
Grape pest insects